Robert Louis Ridarelli (April 26, 1942 – April 5, 2022), known by the stage name Bobby Rydell , was an American singer and actor who mainly performed rock and roll and traditional pop music. In the early 1960s he was considered a teen idol. His most well-known songs include "Wildwood Days," "Wild One" and "Volare" (cover of an Italian song by Domenico Modugno, "Nel blu, dipinto di blu"); in 1963 he appeared in the musical film Bye Bye Birdie.

In the 1980s, he joined a trio called The Golden Boys, with fellow former teen idols Frankie Avalon and Fabian Forte. He continued to tour up until his death in 2022.

Early life
Rydell was born in April 1942 and was the son of Jennie Ridarelli (nee Sapienza) and Adrio "Al" Ridarelli. Both of his parents were of Italian descent. He grew up in the Lower Moyamensing neighborhood of South Philadelphia.

As a child, he mimicked the singers he saw on television, and at the age of seven his father took him around the clubs of Philadelphia, asking if he could sing and do some impersonations. By the time he was eight, his reputation led to an appearance on a talent show on the national television series,TV Teen Club. He won the contest, and the show's presenter, Paul Whiteman, recruited him into the cast, where he remained for several years. It was here that his name was Anglicised to Bobby Rydell.

Music career
Rydell played in several bands in the Philadelphia area. As a 14 year old he was the drummer for the Enamons (NoNames spelled backward) which included his childhood friend Pat Azzara on guitar.   Azzara later took on the stage name Pat Martino and became the Jazz guitar legend. Another band was  Rocco and the Saints, in which he sang and played drums. After releasing three unsuccessful singles for small companies, he signed a recording contract with Cameo Records. This was run by Bernie Lowe, who had been the pianist accompanying him on TV Teen Club. After a couple of flops, "Kissin' Time" made the charts in 1959. In May 1960, Rydell toured Australia with The Everly Brothers, Billy "Crash" Craddock, Marv Johnson, The Champs, The Crickets, and Lonnie Lee.

His second success was "We Got Love". The album of the same name, his first, sold a million copies and obtained gold disc status. "Wild One" was followed with "Little Bitty Girl" which was his second million-selling single. He continued releasing hit songs with "Swingin' School" backed by "Ding-A-Ling" and "Volare" later in 1960, which also sold over a million copies. It is estimated he sold over 25 million records in total. 

In 1961, he performed at the Copacabana in New York City, where he was the youngest performer to headline at the nightclub. In February 1961, he appeared at the Festival du Rock at the Palais des Sports de Paris in Paris, France.

Rydell's success and prospects led his father, Adrio, a foreman at the Electro-Nite Carbon Company in Philadelphia, to resign in 1961 after 22 years to become his son's road manager.

In 1963, Rydell released the song "Wildwood Days," which reached Number 17 on the Billboard Hot 100 chart and remained there for nine weeks. A mural on the Wildwood, New Jersey, boardwalk, painted in 2014,  honors Rydell, whose song placed the community in the national spotlight.

That same year, Rydell portrayed Hugo Peabody in the film version of Bye Bye Birdie, also starring Ann-Margret and Dick Van Dyke. The original stage production of Bye Bye Birdie had no real singing role for the character of Hugo, but the movie script was rewritten specifically to expand the part for Rydell. In 2011, Sony Pictures digitally restored the film. Rydell and Ann-Margret were in attendance at the restoration premiere in Beverly Hills, hosted by the Academy of Motion Picture Arts and Sciences.

During the 1960s, Rydell had numerous hit records on the Billboard Hot 100 chart. His recording career earned him 34 Top 100 hits, placing him in the top five artists of his era (Billboard). They included his most popular successes: "Wild One" (his highest scoring single, at number 2), "Volare" (number 4), "Swingin' School" (number 5), "Kissin' Time" (number 11), "Sway" (number 14), "I've Got Bonnie" (number 18), and "The Cha-Cha-Cha" (number 10). His last major chart success was "Forget Him", which reached number 4 on the Hot 100 in January 1964. The song, written by Tony Hatch, was his fifth and final gold disc winner.

Rydell left Cameo-Parkway Records later in 1964 and signed with Capitol Records. By that point, the British Invasion had arrived and acts such as Rydell suffered a dramatic decline in popularity. Bands such as The Beatles became more popular, and Rydell unwittingly contributed to his own downfall by inspiring John Lennon and Paul McCartney to write "She Loves You", a song which catapulted their success way beyond his.

During that time, he performed on many television programs, including The Red Skelton Show, where a recurring role as Zeke Kadiddlehopper, Clem Kadiddlehopper's younger cousin, was written for him by Skelton. He also appeared on The Danny Thomas Show, Jack Benny, Joey Bishop, and The George Burns Show. He was a regular on The Milton Berle Show and was a panelist on To Tell the Truth in 1964. On October 6, 1964, he made a guest appearance on the episode "Duel" of the television series Combat!. It was Rydell's first dramatic acting role.

In 1963, Rydell starred in an unsold television pilot called Swingin' Together produced by Desilu Productions, which featured him as the frontman for a four-piece rock 'n roll band seeking their big break. Also during that time, Rydell served in the 103rd Engineer Battalion of the Pennsylvania Army National Guard.

In January 1968, it was announced in the UK music magazine NME that Rydell had signed a long term recording contract with Reprise Records. He continued to perform in nightclubs, supper clubs and Las Vegas venues throughout the 1970s and 1980s, but his career was hampered by the refusal by ABKCO Records to reissue Rydell's Cameo-Parkway catalog, so it was completely unavailable until 2005, although he did re-record his hits in 1995 for K-tel Records). He had one more hit after 1965, a disco re-recording of "Sway", which reached the Billboard Easy Listening chart in 1976.

Rydell continued to tour for the remainder of his life, often with Frankie Avalon and Fabian Forte, performing under the name "The Golden Boys". His autobiography was published in 2016.

Personal life
Rydell was married to his first wife, Camille Quattrone Ridarelli, for 35 years, from 1968 until her death in 2003. They had two children. He married Linda Hoffman in 2009. Rydell was a longtime resident of Penn Valley, Pennsylvania, and lived in the same house from 1963 to 2013. 

Rydell served in the U.S. National Guard, and began his service in 1964 with two months of basic training at Fort Dix. 

The street on which he was born in Philadelphia was renamed Bobby Rydell Boulevard, in his honor.

Health and death
Rydell cancelled a 2012 Australia tour because his health had deteriorated significantly and he was in need of urgent major surgery. On July 9, 2012, he underwent a double organ transplant, to replace his liver and one kidney, at Thomas Jefferson University in his hometown of Philadelphia. In January 2013, six months after the double transplant surgery, Rydell returned to the stage in Las Vegas for a three-night engagement to a sold-out audience. He continued to perform internationally and returned to tour Australia in 2014.

Rydell died from complications of pneumonia at Jefferson Abington Hospital on April 5, 2022, at the age of 79.

Media
In the Broadway musical drama Grease, its film adaptation, and the film's sequel Grease 2, the high school was named "Rydell High" after Rydell.

In 2000, in the book The Beatles Anthology (p. 96), Paul McCartney said: John [Lennon] and I wrote "She Loves You" together. There was a Bobby Rydell song out at the time and, as often happens, you think of one song when you write another. We'd planned an "answering song" where a couple of us would sing "she loves you" and the other ones would answer "yeah yeah". We decided that was a crummy idea but at least we then had the idea of a song called "She Loves You". So we sat in the hotel bedroom for a few hours and wrote it—John and I, sitting on twin beds with guitars.

No specific song title is given in The Beatles Anthology, but Bob Spitz writes in The Beatles: The Biography that McCartney originally modeled "She Loves You" on the Rydell "answering song" called "Swingin' School", and not "Forget Him", as is commonly cited.

In the Oscar-winning film Green Book (2018), Rydell is portrayed in the opening scenes by actor Von Lewis.

Albums discography
Source:

We Got Love (1959)
Bobby Sings, Bobby Swings (1960)
Bobby's Biggest Hits (1961) (U.S. No. 12)
Bobby Rydell Salutes the Great Ones (1961)
Rydell at the Copa (1961) (U.S. No. 56)
Bobby Rydell/Chubby Checker (1961) (U.S. No. 7)
Twistin (1962)  Venise (also includes tracks by Barry Norman and Stephen Garrick)
All the Hits (1962) (U.S. No. 88)
Bobby's Biggest Hits Vol. 2 (1962) (U.S. No. 61)
All the Hits Vol. 2 (1962)
Bye Bye Birdie (1963)
Wild (Wood) Days (1963)
Chubby Checker & Bobby Rydell (1963)
Top Hits of 1963 (1963) (U.S. No. 67)
Forget Him (1964) (U.S. No. 98)
16 Golden Hits (1965)
Somebody Loves You (1965)
Born With a Smile (1976)(1999)
Best of Bobby Rydell (1976) (AUS No. 87)
Bobby Rydell at His Best: Today and Yesterday (1983)
Best of Bobby Rydell (2000) Prestige
Now and Then (2000) Para Group International
The Complete Bobby Rydell on Capitol (2001) Collectors' Choice
Cameo Parkway 1959–1964: Best of Bobby Rydell (2006)
Bobby Rydell Salutes the Great Ones/Rydell at the Copa (2010) Ace
Chubby Checker and Bobby Rydell (2012) Hallmark
Very Best of Bobby Rydell (2012)
Return of the Original American Idol (2014)
All the Hits (2017) Eclipse
Seven Classics Albums PLus (2017)
All the Hits/Bobby Rydell and Chubby Checker (2017) Liberty Bell
Bobby Rydell Salutes the Great Ones (2017) Liberty Bell
Bobby Sings/We Got Love (2017) Liberty Bell
Wildwood Days (2017) Liberty Bell
Bobby Rydell Sings /Strand
Starring Bobby Rydell /Spin-O-Rama

Singles discography

† Chubby Checker and Bobby Rydell
 b/w = "backed with"

Selected filmography
 Bye Bye Birdie (1963)
 Combat!: The Duel (1964)
 That Lady from Peking (1975)
 Mr. Rock 'n' Roll: The Alan Freed Story (1999)

See also

List of people from Philadelphia
History of Italian Americans in Philadelphia
List of acts who appeared on American Bandstand
List of Italian-American entertainers
List of stage names

References

External links

Official website
[ Bobby Rydell at Billboard.com]
History-of-rock.com
 Cameo Parkway history, pictures, lists
Bobby Rydell obituary on Best Classic Bands
 
 

1942 births
2022 deaths
20th-century American male actors
20th-century American male singers
20th-century American singers
21st-century American male singers
21st-century American singers
American impressionists (entertainers)
American autobiographers
American male film actors
American male musicians
American male pop singers
American male television actors
American people of Italian descent
American rock singers
Cameo Records artists
Comedians from Pennsylvania
Deaths from pneumonia in Pennsylvania
Kidney transplant recipients
Musicians from Philadelphia
People from Lower Merion Township, Pennsylvania
Reprise Records artists
Singers from Pennsylvania
Traditional pop music singers